Albino Zertuche Municipality is a municipality in Puebla in south-eastern Mexico.

Etymology
Named after Albino Zertuche.

References

Municipalities of Puebla